Psittacanthus barlowii is a species of plant of the genus, Psittacanthus, in the family Loranthaceae. It is endemic to Ecuador. Its natural habitat is subtropical or tropical moist lowland forests.

References

Endemic flora of Ecuador
barlowii
Near threatened plants
Taxonomy articles created by Polbot